The concept of the Two-Nation Theory on which Pakistan was founded, was largely based on Muslim nationalism. The supporters of Islamisation assert that Pakistan was founded as a Muslim state and that in its status as an Islamic republic, it must thereby implement Islamic laws, known as Sharia and, that the context of Jinnah's speech was true implementation of Islam in which all religions would have equal rights and live as free citizens as supported by the Islamic jurisprudence itself as distinguished from a religious oligarchy.

History
Although Pakistan was founded as a separate state for Muslims in the Indian subcontinent in 1947, it remained a Dominion in the British Commonwealth and did not immediately become an Islamic state. Although the 1949 Objectives Resolution envisaged an official role for Islam as the state religion, the state retained most of the laws inherited from the secular British legal code that had been enforced by the British Raj since the 19th century.

Pakistan adopted a constitution in 1956, becoming an Islamic republic with Islam as its state religion. In 1956, the state adopted the name of the "Islamic Republic of Pakistan", declaring Islam as the official religion, but did not take any further measures to adopt Islamic laws.

Jinnah said:

Islamization

As a reaction to the bifurcation of Pakistan (due to the rise of secularist forces in East Pakistan) in 1971, Islamic political parties began to see an increase in popular support. In the 1970s, the populist and elected Prime minister Zulfikar Ali Bhutto caved in to a major demand of the Islamic parties by declaring the Ahmadiyya Community to be non-Muslims. Under the constitution of 1973, Bhutto also banned alcohol, gambling and night clubs.

Bhutto was overthrown in 1977 by Chief of Army Staff General Zia-ul-Haq, who went considerably further with the formal campaign of Islamization of Pakistan (1977–1988). General Muhammad Zia-ul-Haq, the ruler of Pakistan from 1977 until his death in 1988, been called "the person most responsible for turning Pakistan into a global center for political Islam."

See also 

 Secularization
 Desecularization
 Postsecularism
 Secularity
 Secular state
 Secularism
 Separation of church and state
 Sociology of religion
 State religion

References

External links
 Secular Jinnah, Secular Jinnah and Pakistan -What the Nation Doesn't Know, Saleena Kareem
 The Express Tribune Pakistan, Was Jinnah Secular
 Telegraph, Pakistan Seeks of Jinnah Calling For Secular State
 The Search For Jinnahs Vision of Pakistan

 
Political movements in Pakistan
Religion in Pakistan
Pakistan